Wataynikaneyap Power is a First Nation-led company in Northern Ontario that was established in 2010. Wataynikaneyap Power first mandate was to "design, permit, construct, own and operate a 230 kV transmission line" which would provide "additional grid connection" to Pickle Lake. 

February 3, 2011, Ministry of Energy Directive and the Ministry's November 23, 2010, Long Term Energy Plan supported the construction of this transmission line as phase one of a two-part process, to improve the connectivity of remote First Nation communities. 

The "second phase would extend the grid north of Pickle Lake to service the remote communities." A December 6 news release said that "significant pre-development work" was completed. The new transmission network will replace the polluting and expensive diesel generators that are used in remote Northwestern Ontario communities. 

Twenty First Nations communities are equal owners of Wataynikaneyap Power. Goldcorp had "provided early development funding" and had partnered with the First Nation communities from 2010 to 2015.

References

Energy companies of Canada